Bhagwati Prasad Sagar (born 28 May 1955) is an Indian politician and former Minister of State (Independent Charge) for the Department of Labour Affairs in the Government of Uttar Pradesh. He was member of Uttar Pradesh Legislative Assembly representing Bilhaur constituency of Kanpur Nagar district.

He joined Samajwadi Party in 2022.

References

1955 births
Living people
People from Kanpur Nagar district
Uttar Pradesh MLAs 2017–2022
Samajwadi Party politicians from Uttar Pradesh